Mesoamerican creation myths are the collection of creation myths attributed to, or documented for, the various cultures and civilizations of pre-Columbian Mesoamerica and Mesoamerican literature.

The Maya gods included Kukulkán (also known by the Kʼicheʼ name Gukumatz and the Aztec name Quetzalcoatl) and Tepeu. The two were referred to as the Creators, the Forefathers or the Makers. According to the story, the two gods decided to preserve their legacy by creating an Earth-bound species looking like them. The first attempt was man made from mud, but Tepeu and Kukulkán found that the mud crumbled. The two gods summoned the other gods, and together they decided to make man from wood. However, since these men had no soul and soon lost loyalty to the creators, the gods destroyed them by rain. Finally, man was constructed from maize, the Mayans staple and sacred food. The deity Itzamna is credited as being the creator of the calendar along with creating writing.

Other creation myths that are commonly known to natives of the Mesoamerican region include The Emergence of the Ancestors (Aztec), The Man of the Crops (Jicaque), Why the Earth Eats the Dead (Bribri), and Opossum Steals Fire (Mazatec).

See also
Mesoamerican religion
Mesoamerican literature
Mesoamerican world tree
Five Suns
Fifth World (Native American mythology)

References

External links
 History and Info - The Maya Calendar
 Mayan Astronomy Page - Maya Calendar

Creation myths
Mesoamerican mythology and religion
Maya mythology and religion
Aztec mythology and religion